USS Marinette (LCS-25) will be a  littoral combat ship of the United States Navy. She will be the first commissioned ship, and second overall in naval service to be named after Marinette, Wisconsin (the place where it was built), the other being , a  large fleet tugboat.

Design 
In 2002, the US Navy initiated a program to develop the first of a fleet of littoral combat ships. The Navy initially ordered two monohull ships from Lockheed Martin, which became known as the Freedom-class littoral combat ships after the first ship of the class, . Odd-numbered US Navy littoral combat ships are built using the Freedom-class monohull design, while even-numbered ships are based on a competing design, the trimaran hull  from General Dynamics. The initial order of littoral combat ships involved a total of four ships, including two of the Freedom-class design.  Marinette is the thirteenth Freedom-class littoral combat ship to be built.

Construction and career 
Marinette Marine was awarded the contract to build the ship on 31 March 2016 and built at their shipyard in Marinette, Wisconsin. The ship was launched on 31 October 2020, subsequently she was christened on 20 November 2021.

References

 

Freedom-class littoral combat ships
Lockheed Martin
2020 ships